The 2018 Central Connecticut Blue Devils football team represented Central Connecticut State University in the 2018 NCAA Division I FCS football season. They were led by fifth-year head coach Pete Rossomando and played their home games at Arute Field. They were a member of the Northeast Conference. They finished the season 6–5, 4–2 in NEC play to finish in third place.

Previous season
The Blue Devils finished the 2017 season 8–4, 6–0 in NEC play to win the conference title. They received the NEC's automatic bid to the FCS Playoffs, their first FCS playoff appearance in school history, where they were defeated by New Hampshire in the First Round.

Preseason

NEC coaches poll
The NEC released their preseason coaches poll on July 24, 2018, with the Blue Devils predicted to become NEC champions.

Preseason All-NEC team
The Blue Devils placed seven players on the preseason all-NEC team.

Offense

Jacob Dolegala – QB

Arthur Gilmore – TE

J’Von Brown – OL

Connor Mignone – OL

Defense

Chris Tinkham – DL

Kenneth Keen – LB

Tajik Bagley – DB

Schedule

Game summaries

at Ball State

Lincoln (PA)

Columbia

at Fordham

at Lafayette

at Robert Morris

at Bryant

Sacred Heart

Wagner

at Saint Francis (PA)

Duquesne

References

Central Connecticut
Central Connecticut Blue Devils football seasons
Central Connecticut Blue Devils football